San Martin station is a Caltrain station located in the downtown area of San Martin, California. The station is only served during weekday peak hours, with northbound trains in the morning and southbound trains in the evening.

References

External links

Caltrain - San Martin

Caltrain stations in Santa Clara County, California
Railway stations in the United States opened in 1992